Parliamentary elections were held in Brazil on 7 October 1962. Voter turnout was 79.6%. These were the only elections to be held under the parliamentary republican system of government introduced in 1960.

Results

Chamber of Deputies

Senate

References

General elections in Brazil
Brazil
Legislative
1962 in Brazil
Brazil
Election and referendum articles with incomplete results